William Stacpoole (1830 – 10 July 1879) was an Irish nationalist politician.  From 1860 to 1879 he was Member of Parliament (MP) for Ennis in County Clare, taking his seat in the House of Commons of the United Kingdom of Great Britain and Ireland.

Stacpoole was elected to the Parliament at an unopposed by-election in February 1860, standing as a Liberal after the sitting Liberal MP John FitzGerald had been appointed as a judge. He was re-elected in 1865, easily defeating a rival Liberal candidate, and was returned unopposed in 1868. When he stood as a Home Rule League candidate in 1874, he faced opposition again, also from his own party.  His opponent, The O'Gorman Mahon was a long-serving MP who had represented Ennis as for the Repeal Association from 1847 to 1852, but Stacpoole held the seat by 115 votes to 99. He died in office in 1879, aged 49.

References

External links 
 

1830 births
1879 deaths
19th-century Irish people
Members of the Parliament of the United Kingdom for County Clare constituencies (1801–1922)
Irish Liberal Party MPs
Home Rule League MPs
UK MPs 1859–1865
UK MPs 1865–1868
UK MPs 1868–1874
UK MPs 1874–1880
Politicians from County Clare